Sudhindra Tirtha can refer to:
Sudhindra Tirtha (1596 - 1623)  - a Dvaita philosopher of aesthetics, dramatist and the pontiff of the matha at Kumbakonam.
Sudhindra Tirtha (Kashi Math) (1926 - 2016) - 20th Mathadhipathi of Kashi Math.